Akgül or Akgul (meaning "White Rose" in several Turkic languages) may refer to:

Surname
  (born 1970),Turkish soccer club owner
 Bilal Akgül (born 1982), Turkish Olympian mountain biker
 Ferman Akgül (born 1979), Turkish songwriter 
 Mustafa Akgül (born 1948), Turkish information technologist
  (born 1971),Turkish server and academician
 Sezar Akgül (born 1987), Turkish sport wrestler
  (born 1963),Turkish cartoonist and academician
 Taha Akgül (born 1990), Turkish sport wrestler
  (born 1996),Turkish professional kick boxing athlete

Given name
 Akgul Amanmuradova, Uzbekistani tennis player

Turkish feminine given names
Turkish-language surnames